The , Central region, or  is a region in the middle of Honshū, Japan's main island. In a wide, classical definition, it encompasses nine prefectures (ken): Aichi, Fukui, Gifu, Ishikawa, Nagano, Niigata, Shizuoka, Toyama, and Yamanashi.

It is located directly between the Kantō region and the Kansai region and includes the major city of Nagoya as well as Pacific Ocean and Sea of Japan coastlines, extensive mountain resorts, and Mount Fuji.

The region is the widest part of Honshū and the central part is characterized by high, rugged mountains. The Japanese Alps divide the country into the Pacific side, sunny in winter, and the Sea of Japan side, snowy in winter.

Although Mie is part of Kinki/Kansai/Western Japan in traditional geographical regional divisions, Northern Mie is part of the metropolitan area around Nagoya, and Mie is in many practical contexts considered to be part of Tōkai/Chūbu/Central Japan. Including Mie, Chūbu had a population of 23,010,276 as of 1 June 2019.

Other definitions 
In the MLIT of the central government, the jurisdiction of the Chūbu regional development bureau (中部地方整備局, Chūbu-chihō seibi-kyoku; (ja)) extends to five prefectures: Gifu, Shizuoka, Aichi, Mie and the Southern part of Nagano.

In the National Police Agency, the Chūbu Regional Police Bureau (中部管区警察局, Chūbu kanku keisatsu-kyoku; (ja)) is responsible for six prefectural police forces: Toyama, Ishikawa, Fukui, Gifu, Aichi and Mie.

In local government, the Chūbu area governors' association (中部圏知事会, Chūbuken chijikai) unites the governors of Toyama, Ishikawa, Fukui, Nagano, Gifu, Shizuoka, Aichi, Mie and Shiga and the mayor of Nagoya City in Aichi.

Geography 

Located in the center of the Japanese archipelago. It refers to the area between the Kanto, Tohoku and Kansai regions. It began to be used in the late Meiji era as a tentative name for unclassified areas. In a broad sense, it often refers to the eight regional divisions and similar ranges. In a narrow sense it may refer to a range similar to the Tōkai region.

The terrain is mainly rugged and mountainous except for the Nōbi Plain and coastal areas. The steep Japanese Alps rise in the central area. It is located between Tokyo and Osaka, which are the east–west centers of the Japanese economy and culture. Thus the Chubu region has various differences between the eastern side and the western side.

Subregions
The Chūbu region covers a large and geographically diverse area of Honshū which leads to it generally being divided into three distinct subregions: Tōkai, Kōshin'etsu, and Hokuriku.  There is also another subregion occasionally referred to in business circles called Chūkyō.

Tōkai

The Tōkai region, mostly bordering the Pacific Ocean, is a narrow corridor interrupted in places by mountains that descend into the sea.

Since the Tokugawa period (1600–1867), this corridor has been critical in linking Tokyo, Kyoto, and Osaka.  One of old Japan's most important ancient roadways, the Tōkaidō, ran through it connecting Tokyo (at that time called Edo) and Kyoto, the old imperial capital.  In the twentieth century, it became the route for new super-express highways and high-speed railroad lines (shinkansen). The area consists of Aichi, Mie, Shizuoka, and southern Gifu prefectures.

A number of small alluvial plains are found in the corridor section. A mild climate, favorable location relatively close to the great metropolitan complexes, and availability of fast transportation have made this area a center for truck-gardening and out-of-season vegetables.  Upland areas of rolling hills are extensively given over to the growing of mandarin oranges and tea.  Nagoya, which faces Ise Bay, is a center for heavy industry, including iron and steel and machinery manufacturing.  The corridor also has a number of small but important industrial centers.  The western part of Tōkai includes the Nōbi Plain, where rice was being grown by the seventh century.

Chūkyō
The three Tōkai prefectures centered on Nagoya (Aichi, Gifu, and Mie) have particularly strong economic ties, and the parts of these prefectures that are closest to the city comprise the Chūkyō Metropolitan Area.  This area boasts the third strongest economy in Japan and this influence can sometimes extend into the more remote parts of these prefectures that are farther away from Nagoya.  Thus, these three prefectures are sometimes called the "Chūkyō region" in a business sense.  This name does not see widespread usage throughout Japan; however, as the economy in the area strengthens, this name may become more well-known country-wide.

Kōshin'etsu

Kōshin'etsu is an area of complex and high rugged mountains—often called the "roof of Japan"—that include the Japanese Alps. The population is chiefly concentrated in six elevated basins connected by narrow valleys.  It was long a main silk-producing area, although output declined after World War II.  Much of the labor formerly required in silk production was absorbed by the district's diversified manufacturing industry, which included precision instruments, machinery, textiles, food processing, and other light manufacturing. Kōshin'etsu means Yamanashi, Nagano, and Niigata prefectures; Niigata is also included to the Hokuriku region. Yamanashi, Nagano and northern Gifu Prefecture are sometimes referred to as Chūō-kōchi or Tōsan region.

Hokuriku

The Hokuriku region lies on the Sea of Japan coastline, northwest of the massive mountains that comprise Kōshin'etsu. Hokuriku includes the four prefectures of Ishikawa, Fukui, most of Niigata and Toyama,

The district has very heavy snowfall (sometimes enough to block major roads) and strong winds in winter, and its turbulent rivers are the source of abundant hydroelectric power. Niigata Prefecture is the site of domestic gas and oil production as well.  Industrial development is extensive, especially in the cities in Niigata and Toyama; Fukui and Ishikawa prefectures also have large manufacturing industries.

Historically, Hokuriku's development is owed to markets in the Kansai region, however recently the urban areas at the heart of the Kantō region and Tōkai region are having a heavy an influence as well.  Hokuriku has port facilities which are mainly to facilitate trade with Russia, Korea and China.  Transportation between Niigata and Toyama used to be geographically limited and so Niigata has seen especially strong influence from the Kantō region, because of this Niigata Prefecture is often classified as being part of the Kōshin'etsu region with Nagano and Yamanashi Prefectures.

Demographics 
The three most dense areas of Chūbu region are Chūkyō metropolitan area (greater Nagoya), Niigata-Toyama area at Hokuriku subregion, and Nagano at the mountains (Chūō-kōchi).

Per Japanese census data, and, Chūbu region has had positive population growth.

Major cities 

Designated city
 Nagoya City: a designated city, the capital of Aichi Prefecture
 Niigata City: a designated city, the capital of Niigata Prefecture
 Hamamatsu City: a designated city
 Shizuoka City:a designated city, the capital of Shizuoka Prefecture
Core city
 Kanazawa City: a core city, the capital of Ishikawa Prefecture
 Toyama City: a core city, the capital of Toyama Prefecture
 Gifu City: a core city, the capital of Gifu Prefecture
 Nagano City: a core city, the capital of Nagano Prefecture
 Fukui City: a core city, the capital of Fukui Prefecture
 Kofu City: a core city, the capital of Yamanashi Prefecture

Other major cities 

 Toyota City: a core city
 Okazaki City: a core city
 Toyohashi City: a core city
 Ichinomiya City: a special city
 Kasugai City: a special city
 Nagaoka City: a special city
 Fuji City: a special city
 Matsumoto City: a special city
 Jōetsu City: a special city
 Numazu City: a special city

See also
Geography of Japan
Hokuriku dialect
List of regions of Japan
Tōkai–Tōsan dialect

References

Citations
 Nussbaum, Louis-Frédéric (2002 [1996]).  Japan Encyclopedia. Trans. by Käthe Roth. Cambridge, Massachusetts: Harvard University Press. , . .

External links

More information on Chubu Region.